Stars on 45 was a Dutch novelty pop act that was successful in Europe, the United States, and Australia in the early 1980s. The group later shortened its name to Stars On in the U.S., while in the United Kingdom and Ireland it was known as Starsound (or Star Sound). The band, which consisted solely of studio session musicians under the direction of Jaap Eggermont, formerly of Golden Earring, recorded medley recordings made by recreating hit songs as faithfully as possible and joining them together with a common tempo and underlying drum track.

History
Mark Haley & Lawrence Haley originated the "Stars on 45" concept after Willem van Kooten, managing director of the Dutch publishing company Red Bullet Productions, visited a record store in the summer of 1979 and happened to hear a disco medley being played there. The medley combined original recordings of songs by the Beatles, the Buggles, the Archies and Madness with a number of recent American and British disco hits like Lipps Inc.'s "Funkytown," Heatwave's "Boogie Nights," and The S.O.S. Band's "Take Your Time (Do It Right)," as the rhythms of the various songs tended to complement and "dovetail" into each other. When van Kooten heard that the medley also used a segment of "Venus," a 1970 US #1 hit by Dutch band Shocking Blue — a song for which he himself held the worldwide copyright — and knowing that neither he nor Red Bullet Productions had given the permission for the use of the recording, he realised that the medley in fact was a bootleg release. The record turned out to be a 12-inch single called "Let's Do It In The 80's Great Hits," credited to a nonexistent band called Passion and issued on a nonexistent record label called Alto. The medley had its origin in Montreal, Quebec, Canada, and it was later revealed that it was the work of one Michel Ali, together with two professional DJs, Michel Gendreau and Paul Richer. Gendreau and Richer both specialised in the art of "splicing," stringing together snippets of music from different genres, in varying keys and BPMs and from different sound sources, at this time still predominantly from vinyl records. The first version of the medley was eight minutes long, and it included parts from some twenty tracks of which only three were by the Beatles: "No Reply," "I'll Be Back," and "Drive My Car." A later extended, 16-minute, 30-track mix of the same medley labeled "Bits and Pieces III" added another five Beatles titles: "*Do You Want to Know a Secret," "We Can Work It Out," "I Should Have Known Better," "Nowhere Man," and "You're Gonna Lose That Girl." With the bootleg recording obviously already circulating in dance clubs on both sides of the Atlantic, van Kooten decided to "bootleg the bootleg" and create a licensed version of the medley by using soundalike artists to replicate the original hits and therefore contacted his friend and colleague Jaap Eggermont.

The Beatles soundalikes were established Dutch singers. John Lennon's parts were sung by Bas Muys of the 1970s Dutch pop group Smyle. Paul McCartney's and George Harrison's parts were sung by Sandy Coast frontman Hans Vermeulen and Okkie Huijsdens, who had worked with Vermeulen in the band Rainbow Train. Apart from the recreated songs, an original chorus and hook written and composed by Eggermont and musical arranger Martin Duiser called "Stars on 45" was added at intervals to help string differing sections together. The '45' in the title refers to the playback speed of a vinyl record single — 45 rpm; such singles were often simply called "45s." The female vocalist in the chorus was session singer Jody Pijper; later recordings also featured uncredited vocals by Dutch 1970s star Albert West and Arnie Treffers of the rock revival band Long Tall Ernie and the Shakers. The Stars on 45 recordings were made before the birth of digital recording technology, which meant that each song was recorded separately and the different parts were subsequently manually pieced together with a pre-recorded drumloop, using analog master tapes, in order to create the segued medleys. The specific drumloop heard on most Stars on 45 recordings is often referred to as the "clap track," due to its prominent and steady handclaps.

The first such release was an 11:30 12" single, issued in the aftermath of the so-called anti-disco backlash, and was released on the (at the time) minor label CNR Records in the Netherlands in December 1980. The single was simply entitled "Stars on 45" by Stars on 45, with no credits on the label or the cover as to who actually sang on the recording. When Dutch radio stations began playing the four-minute, eight-track Beatles segment of the medley, placed in the middle of the original, 12" mix, an edited 7" single with the Beatles part preceded by "Venus" and The Archies's "Sugar Sugar" was released and hit the #1 spot of the Dutch singles charts in February 1981. A few months later it also reached #2 in the UK, where it was released by the British subsidiary of CBS Records and credited to 'Starsound.' Shortly thereafter Eggermont created the first Stars on 45 album, Long Play Album, issued with an equally anonymous album cover and featuring a 16-minute side-long medley of Beatles titles.
In June 1981 the "Stars on 45 Medley" single also went to #1 in the US where it was released by Radio Records, a sublabel of Atlantic Records. The track list for the 7" edit of the "Stars on 45 Medley" in the US was the names of all the songs that make up the medley as it appears on the actual record label (see image at left):

This single with its 41-word title continues to hold the record for a #1 single with the longest name on the Billboard charts, due to the legalities requiring each song title be listed. The Stars on 45 Long Play Album (US title: Stars on Long Play, UK, Ireland, Australia and New Zealand: Stars on 45 — The Album) also became a massive seller worldwide, topping both the UK and Australian album charts, it was a Top 10 hit in most parts of Europe and also reached #9 on Billboards album chart in the US. The popularity of the album even resulted in it being given an official release in the Soviet Union, where it was issued by state-owned record label Melodiya under the title Discothèque Stars. The "Stars on 45 Medley" single was later awarded a platinum disc for one million copies sold in the US alone.

A second Beatles medley went to #67 on the US charts. Another album followed later that same year, Longplay Album – Volume II (US title: Stars on Long Play II; UK, Ireland, South Africa, Australia and New Zealand: Stars on 45 — The Album - Volume 2) featuring medleys using the songs of ABBA, a #2 hit in the UK and Motown, US #55. The recordings of the "Stars on 45" medleys were also made before the advent of modern synthesizers with the possibility of sampling sounds. Consequently, for the recreation of tracks like the themes from "Star Wars" and "The War of the Worlds", included in the "Star Wars and Other Hits" medley on Longplay — Album II and released as the third European single under the title "Volume III," a full symphony orchestra was used, including strings, brass, woodwind, harpsichord, orchestral percussion like timpani etc. — even if those particular parts were only ten or fifteen seconds long on the actual record released.

In late 1981 Eggermont and Martin Duiser were awarded the Conamus Export Prize in the Netherlands in recognition of their contributions to Dutch culture and economy.

A third album, The Superstars (US title: Stars on Long Play III, UK, Ireland, Australia and New Zealand: Stars Medley), featured medleys of The Rolling Stones and Stevie Wonder. The single "Stars on 45 III: A Tribute to Stevie Wonder" peaked at #28 in the US in 1982, where the act was now simply listed as Stars On. It also reached #14 in the UK where it was called "Stars Medley" — confusingly, exactly the same title as the third album in the British Isles and Australasia. In Continental Europe and most other parts of the world the Stevie Wonder medley was entitled "Stars on Stevie." In late 1982, Eggermont and Duiser again won the Conamus Export Prize, this time together with Tony Sherman, who sang lead vocals on "Stars on Stevie."

In 1982, there was a staged musical show at the Huntington Hartford Theater in Hollywood, California and a video of that show was released in 1983 by MCA Home Video.

A spinoff group called The Star Sisters had a hit in Europe in 1983 with an Andrews Sisters medley. The albums were released under the moniker of Stars on 45 Presents the Star Sisters.

1985 saw the release of an album titled Stars on 45 — Soul Revue and a single called "The Sam & Dave Medley" credited to 'Stars on 45 featuring Sam & Dave,' and including the Stars on 45 logo on the album cover, but not produced by Jaap Eggermont. It featured David Prater and his new singing partner Sam Daniels. Original Sam & Dave member Sam Moore demanded that the album and single be recalled; they were later re-labelled and re-issued, but now credited to 'The New Sam & Dave Revue.'

Later European-only releases included Stars on Frankie released in 1987 and some ten years later Stars on 45: The Club Hits; the latter, however, was not produced by Eggermont. While none of the three original Stars on 45 albums have been reissued on CD in their entirety or in their original form, several CD compilations on European budget labels such as EMI's subsidiary Music Club, Arcade, Edel Records, Falcon Neuen Media, Bunny Music, and ZYX Music have been released under the non-copyrighted 'Stars on 45' moniker all through the 1990s and 2000s (decade). These include The Best of Stars on 45, The Very Best of Stars of 45, The Magic of Stars on 45, Stars on 45 Presents the Mighty Megamix Album, The Greatest Stars on 45,  The Non-Stop Party Album, Greatest Stars on 45 Vol. 1, and Greatest Stars on 45 Vol. 2. It should, however, be noted that some of these compilations also feature titles such as "The Carpenters Medley," "Beach Boys Gold," "The Spencer Davis Group Medley," "Love Songs Are Forever," and the like—again, recordings that were neither produced by Jaap Eggermont nor originally released as by Stars on 45 in the 1980s. (See below.)

Similar acts and parodies

Before Stars on 45 
In 1976, the Ritchie Family had scored their biggest U.S. hit with a similar medley named "The Best Disco in Town". This had incorporated various pop hits of the day, such as Silver Convention's "Fly, Robin, Fly" and Donna Summer's "Love to Love You Baby", recreated in an order, and segued by the title theme.

Four years before the release of the "Stars on 45", a similar medley named Rockollection was produced by the Frenchman Laurent Voulzy.  Around the same time, Shalamar debuted with their single Uptown Festival, featuring a medley of Motown hits from the 60's. Dutch band Veronica Unlimited scored a big hit in 1977 in the Benelux countries and at home with the disco medley What Kind of Dance Is This.  The band Café Crème played its Unlimited Citations (1977) by taking the original Beatles recordings, editing them into a sequence, overdubbing identical drum and bass parts, singing hit songs as faithfully as possible, and stringing them together, with a common tempo and relentless underlying drum track.  The single, with its 45-word title, was a hit throughout Europe (including Netherlands) and North Africa.  The band acted playback on TV but played the medley live in a different place every night over more than 500 nights (almost two years) in multiple countries.

Discography

Long Play Album (1981)
Longplay Album – Volume II (1981)
The Superstars (1982)
Stars on Frankie (1987)

See also
 Stars on 54

References

External links
 
 Rateyourmusic.com biography and discography
 Dutch biography and discography
 [ Billboard.com biography and chart history]
 Official Charts, UK chart history
 Dutch chart history
 Liner notes, The Very Best of Stars on 45

Dutch dance music groups
CBS Records artists
Atlantic Records artists
Medley music groups